The 2014 Baylor Bears football team represented Baylor University in the 2014 NCAA Division I FBS football season. The Bears were coached by Art Briles.  Playing their 116th football season, this was the team's first in the new McLane Stadium in Waco, Texas. The Bears were members of the Big 12 Conference. They finished the season 11–2, 8–1 in Big 12 play to finish as co-champions. They were invited to the Cotton Bowl Classic where they lost to Michigan State after blowing a 41–21 4th quarter lead.

Recruiting

Schedule

Schedule Source:

Roster

Returning starters

Offense

Defense

Special teams

Depth chart
Baylor Updated Depth Chart

Game summaries

SMU

Northwestern State

@ Buffalo

@ Iowa State

@ Texas

#9 TCU

    
    
    
    
    
    
    
    
    
    
    
    
    
    
    
    
    
    
    
    
    

Bryce Petty 28/55, 510 Yds, 6 TD, 2 INT

@ West Virginia

Kansas

@ #15 Oklahoma

Oklahoma State

vs. Texas Tech

#9 Kansas State

vs. #7 Michigan State–Cotton Bowl Classic

Rankings

References

Baylor
Baylor Bears football seasons
Big 12 Conference football champion seasons
Baylor Bears football